Miriam Cahn (born July 21, 1949, in Basel) is a Swiss painter.

Biography 
Cahn studied at Schule für Gestaltung Basel in Basle from 1968 to 1975.

Work 
Cahn's paintings and drawings incorporate feminism and child endangering themes, female rituals; featuring "violent and shocking representations of sexual organs". They are often created using unorthodox methods. Cahn's first exhibition was Being a Women in My Public Role in 1979. Cahn's first exhibition in the United States was at the Elizabeth Dee Gallery, New York City, in 2011. Cahn's work has been said to show influence by the Neo-Expressionism movement.

At first glance, most of the motifs used by Miriam Cahn appear unspectacular,: people, buildings, animals, plants, some in bright or even garish colours, some in gloomy shades of black and grey. Despite such conservative motifs, Cahn is known as a feminist who likes a fight, who often quotes the line ‘your body is a battleground’ from Barbara Kruger’s Untitled (Your Body is a Battleground) (1989) and who withdrew her works from Documenta 7 in 1982 because she felt she had been unfairly treated by the artistic director Rudi Fuchs.
The artist deconstructs her conservative motifs from the inside out. The dreamy-looking watercolours from a 1985–91 series turn out to be studies of atomic explosions (for example, A- + H-tests, 1987). Here, the horror – whose actual violence simply cannot be portrayed – is depicted as a child’s rainbow dress, which only amplifies its awe-inspiring quality. Some of the more recent large-format paintings show naked people in garish, pulsating colours, albeit devoid of any pornographic reference (e.g. o.t., untitled, 2012), as well as country landscapes and abstract geometric shapes (e.g. malfreude, joy in painting, or geträumt, dreamt of, 2012). The installation of these paintings was broken up by small drawings of tanks, clenched fists and rolling pins with sharp blades (e.g. planen, 2012). It’s as if violence were always already lurking in the cracks and joints between supposedly pacified zones.
Cahn’s figures are often surrounded by a shadowy, atmospheric band of colour, a diffuse aura that mediates between the motifs and the colourful non-figurative backgrounds. Such aura outlines are familiar from works as diverse as Wassily Kandinsky’s Dame in Moscow (1912) and Mel Ramos’s Nudes (since the 1960s). Kandinsky used such outlines to symbolize the astral body of theosophy, and Ramos describes his pin-ups as fantasy beings, but Cahn’s glowing body haloes have a different meaning. Traditionally, the hard, ‘masculine’ outline served to set figures apart from their surroundings and to establish them as self-identical individuals. Cahn, by contrast, creates transitions rather than borders; diffusion rather than difference. This approach applies to the sex scenes in the drawings in the series das klassische lieben (Classical Loving, 1997–2001). Hung in the basement, they show fragmented bodies in a process of dissolution, wedged together, merging into one another, pulsing with an energy between passion and violence. It is as if Cahn deliberately placed these works here, in the guts of the Kunstverein, while upstairs, in the colourful paintings, a deceptive calm prevails.

Collections 
Cahn’s works can be found in numerous art collections around the world, among others at MoMA in New York, at the Tate Modern in London, at the Reina Sofía Museum in Madrid, as well as at the Museum of Modern Art in Warsaw.

Exhibitions

Individual exhibitions 
 Miriam CAHN: Ma pensée serielle, Palais de Tokyo, Paris 2023 
 Miriam Cahn: ME AS HAPPENING, Kunsthal Charlottenborg (Copenhagen), 2020–21
 Sifang Art Museum, Nanjing, 2019
MIRIAM CAHN: I AS HUMAN, Museum of Modern Art in Warsaw, 2019
MIRIAM CAHN: I AS HUMAN, Haus der Kunst, Munich, 2019
everything is equally important, Museo Nacional Centro de Arte Reina Sofia, Madrid, 2019
DAS GENAUE HINSCHAUEN, Kunsthaus Bregenz, 2019
ICH ALS MENSCH, Kunstmuseum Bern, 2019
devoir-aimer, Galerie Jocelyn Wolff, Paris, 2017
mare nostrum, Meyer Riegger, Berlin, 2016
Lachen bei gefahr, Badischer Kunstverein, Karlsruhe, 2012
Sarajevo, Stampa, Basel, 1993
Stampa, Basel, 1994
Nachkrieg-Vorkrieg (Was Fehlt), Stampe, Basel, 1992
Museum für Moderne Kunst, Frankfurt am Main, 1992, 1995
Verwandschaften, Galerie Espace, Amsterdam, 1991
Verwandschaften, Stampa, Basel, 1990
Verwandschaften, Art Frankfurt, 1990
Verwandschaften, Cornerhouse, Manchester, 1990
Elisabeth Kaufmann, Zurich, 1988
 Van de Loo, Munich, 1988
Lesen in Staub,  Gemeentemuseum, Arnhem, 1988
Lesen in Staub, Haus am Waldsee, Berlin, 1988
Lesen in Staub/Weibliche Monate, Kunstverein Hannover, 1988
Musée Rath, Geneva, 1988
Lesen in Staub/Strategische Orte, Galerie Schmela, Düsseldorf, 1987
 Centre Culturel Suisse, Paris, 1987
 Galerie Vorsetzen, Hamberg, 1987
 Stampa, Basel, 1987
Strategische Orte, DAAD, Berlin, 1986
Strategische Orte, Stampa, Basel, 1986
Strategische Orte, Kunsthalle Baden-Baden, and Kunstmuseum, Bonn, 1985
Strategische Orte, Elisabeth Kaufmann, Zurich, 1985
Das Klassische Lieben, Musée la Chaux-de-Fonds, 1984
 Das Klassische Lieben, Galerie Grita Insam, Vienna, 1984
 Das Klassische Lieben, Stampa, Basel, 1984
Das Klassische Lieben, Kunsthalle Basel, 1983
Wach Raum 1, Konrad Fischer, Zurich, 1982
Stampa, Basel, 1977, 1979, 1981

Selected group exhibitions 
Documenta 14, Athens, Greece and Kassel, Germany, 2017
21st Sydney Biennal, 2018
Prière de toucher – Le tactile dans l‘art, Museum Tinguely, Basel, 2016
Module mai, Palais de Tokyo, Paris, 2010
Sammlung Van de Loo, Neue National galerie Berlin, 2004
Where Is Abel, Your Brother?, Zachęta – National Gallery of Art, Warsaw, 1995
From Beyond the Pale, Irish Museum of Modern Art, Dublin, 1994
Centre d'Art Contemporian, Geneva, 1994
Zur Sache Selbst, Künstlerinnen des 20. Jahrhunderts Museum, Wiesbaden, 1990
Triennal de Dibuix, Fundació Joan Miró, Barcelona, 1989
Sydney Biennal, 1986
Crosscurrents in Swiss Art, Serpentine Gallery, London, 1984
Documenta, Kassel, Germany, 1982
Feministische Kunst International, Frauenzimmer, Basel, 1979
Claudia Martínez Garay and Miriam Cahn: Ten Thousand Things, Sifang Art Museum, Nanjing, 2020

Reception 
Jörg Scheller describes Cahn as a "feminist who likes to fight." Schorgg comments that Cahn's pieces have a tone he describes as a "deceptive calm", though Export et al. note the "wild sketching" as a key element to the tension between cultural influences in her work.

In 1998 Cahn won the Käthe Kollwitz Prize awarded by the Academy of Arts, Berlin.

References

Further reading 
 Schmetterling, Astrid. "Cahn, Miriam." In Grove Art Online. Oxford Art Online, (accessed February 18, 2012; subscription required).
ed. Marta Dziewańska. "MIRIAM CAHN: I AS HUMAN". Museum of Modern Art in Warsaw (2019).

External links 
 Entry for Miriam Cahn on the Union List of Artist Names.
 Cahn's Collections at Cura Magazine

1949 births
Living people
20th-century Swiss painters
21st-century Swiss painters
20th-century Swiss women artists
21st-century Swiss women artists
Swiss contemporary artists
Swiss Jews
Artists from Basel-Stadt
Swiss women painters
Feminist artists
Neo-expressionist artists